The 2003–04 Slovenian Second League season started on 10 August 2003 and ended on 6 June 2004. Each team played a total of 32 matches.

League standing

See also
2003–04 Slovenian PrvaLiga
2003–04 Slovenian Third League

References
NZS archive

External links
Football Association of Slovenia 

Slovenian Second League seasons
2003–04 in Slovenian football
Slovenia